Haris Zolota is a Bosnian volleyball player at national league level and also an international player for Bosnia and Herzegovina.

With OK Sinpos SAB BANKA he won the Premier League of Volleyball of Bosnia and Herzegovina title (1998) and the National Cup of Bosnia and Herzegovina twice (1998, 1999).

With OK Kakanj he won the Premier League of Volleyball of Bosnia and Herzegovina 5 times (2000, 2001, 2003, 2004, 2005) and the National Cup of Bosnia and Herzegovina 5 times (2001, 2002, 2003, 2004, 2006).

Zolota spent most of his career (1994–2010) playing for OK Kakanj, the Premier League of Volleyball of Bosnia and Herzegovina's most successful volleyball club and he was a team captain in 2001–2006.  He left the club at the end of the 2009–2010 season. He played as Spiker/Opposite.

.

References

Living people
1970 births
Sportspeople from Sarajevo
Bosnia and Herzegovina men's volleyball players